Vietnam Airlines is the flag carrier of Vietnam. The airline was founded in 1956 and later established as a state-owned enterprise in April 1989. Vietnam Airlines is headquartered in Long Biên district, Hanoi, with hubs at Noi Bai International Airport in Hanoi and Tan Son Nhat International Airport in Ho Chi Minh City. The airline flies to 64 destinations in 17 countries, excluding codeshared services.

From its inception until the early 1990s, Vietnam Airlines was a minor carrier within the aviation industry as it was hampered by a variety of factors including the socio-economic and political situation of the country. With the government's normalization of relations with the United States, the airline was able to expand, improve its products and services, and modernize its ageing fleet. In 1996, the Vietnamese government brought together 20 service companies to form Vietnam Airlines Corporation, with the airline itself as the centrepiece. In 2010, the corporation was restructured into a limited liability company and renamed Vietnam Airlines Company Limited. A seven-seat management board, members of which are appointed by the Vietnamese Prime Minister, oversees the company.

As passenger transport constitutes its core activity, Vietnam Airlines plays a crucial role in the economic development of the country. It owns 100% of Vietnam Air Service Company – a regional airline in southern Vietnam and almost 99%% of the low-cost carrier Pacific Airlines. In addition, the corporation earns revenue from airline catering and the maintenance and overhauling of aircraft through a number of its subsidiaries, including Vietnam Airlines Engineering Company and Vietnam Airlines Caterers. The company has also diversified its investments in the aircraft-leasing and airport ground-servicing industries, and is looking to manufacture aircraft components. It controls and operates a cargo division, Vietnam Airlines Cargo.

Vietnam Airlines became a member of SkyTeam in June 2010, making it the first Southeast Asian carrier to have joined that alliance. As of September 2021, the State's stake in Vietnam Airlines is 86.34%, All Nippon Airways holds 5.62%, being a strategic shareholder of the national flag carrier.

History

Beginnings

Vietnam Airlines has its origins in January 1956, when it was established by the North Vietnamese government under the name Vietnam Civil Aviation following the nationalization of Gia Lam Airport. It was instituted after the government signed the Decree No. 666/TTg. The airline was created as part of the air force for civilian purposes with support from both the Soviet Union and China; initially, its fleet consisted of two Lisunov Li-2s that were later replaced by two Ilyushin Il-14 and three Aero Ae-45s. This was due to an embargo that prohibited the airline from leasing and/or buying American technology or components.

The airline's development and expansion was seriously hampered by the Vietnam War (1954–1975). Following the war, its first international destination was Beijing, followed by Vientiane in 1976. In 1978, another important destination of Vietnam Airlines was added, with flights offered to Bangkok. The late 1980s and early 1990s saw the expansion of the network to Hong Kong, Kuala Lumpur, Manila and Singapore.

In 1990, the company initiated discussions regarding the incorporation of Western-built aircraft into the fleet. Later that year, however, the carrier had to cancel the acquisition of two Airbus A310s due to their use of US-manufactured engines. By July 1991, the airline struck a wet-lease agreement with Dutch lessor TransAvia. The aircraft involved was a Boeing 737-300, that arrived in Vietnam Airlines' livery. However, the aircraft was returned after the U.S. State Department pressured the Dutch lessor to remove the aircraft from Vietnam. Subsequently, Vietnam Airlines organized a similar but more complicated deal with TEA Basle, who spent the rest of 1991 negotiating a deal with US authorities. Eventually, a solution stating that "[the Boeing 737] must be positioned outside Vietnam, with no logo or lettering of Vietnam Airlines. On these conditions, it could operate on behalf of Vietnam Airlines" was reached. In December 1991, Cathay Pacific and Vietnam Airlines agreed on a 50–50 joint venture to operate between Hong Kong and Vietnam, as the airline's Tupolev Tu-134 fleet did not meet Kai Tak Airport's noise restrictions.

In October 1992, the Boeing 737 was supplemented with an Airbus A310. However, a dispute with Bulgarian Jes Air over who should pay for the repairs after the aircraft sustained an engine failure led to its replacement with another A310 from GATX, also operated by Jes Air. A similar dispute with United Technologies encouraged the airline to switch from Airbus to Boeing. Hence, a Boeing 767-200ER, leased from Ansett Worldwide Aviation Services (AWAS), arrived in January 1993, and a Royal Brunei Airlines Boeing 767-300ER, arrived the following year. In October 1993, the first Airbus A320-200 was incorporated over a two-year wet-lease contract with Air France. Vietnam Airlines by now had started discussions with Air France about a partnership, and the French carrier agreed to lease its Airbuses to Vietnam Airlines, and also to provide customer support and pilot/crew training. By that time the route network had further expanded internationally, seeing the incorporation of destinations such as Paris, Tokyo, Seoul, Taipei, Sydney, and Melbourne. In 1993, the airline carried 1.06 million passengers, 418,000 of whom were on international flights.

New enterprise: 1993–2006

The airline became the flag carrier of Vietnam in 1993, after having completed a restructuring programme that was started four years earlier. In that year, the airline split from the Civil Aviation Administration of Vietnam (CAAV) and became a state enterprise. The move was similar to the reorganization of the Chinese CAAC Airlines into several regional airlines in 1987. Despite the fact that the airline gained some independence from the CAAV, it was still known as Civil Aviation Administration of Vietnam within the 1993–1996 period.

In February 1994, US President Bill Clinton lifted the trade embargo to allow Vietnam Airlines the ability to acquire Western-built aircraft. Consequently, Vietnam Airlines announced in April of the same year that it would be phasing out its inefficient Soviet planes. By April 1995, the fleet consisted of  Airbus A320s (all of them leased from Air France),  Antonov An-24s,  ATR72s,  Boeing 707-300s,  Ilyushin Il-18s,  Tupolev Tu-134s and  Yakovlev Yak-40s; at this time the route network comprised  domestic destinations (including Ban Me Thuot, Da Nang, Dien Bien Phu, Hue, Nha Trang, Phu Quoc and Pleiku) and  international destinations (including Bangkok, Hong Kong, Kuala Lumpur and Singapore). On , the airline, along with a number of other aviation-related businesses, were incorporated to establish Vietnam Airlines Corporation. Two Fokker 70s were purchased in mid-1995 for  million; they were aimed at partly replacing the Tu-134 fleet on domestic routes as well as at serving as VIP transport. In December 1995, discussions with GECAS for the lease of  additional, second-hand Boeing 767-300ERs were under way; these ex-Continental Airlines aircraft would act as a replacement for wet-leased Boeing 767 aircraft ( -300ERs and  -200ER leased from AWAS and Royal Brunei) in the fleet.

In September 1996, Vietnam Airlines started offering business class services and in 1999, the airline launched its frequent-flyer program, Golden Lotus Plus; During 1996, Vietnam Airlines looked for aircraft which would substitute the A320s wet-leased from Air France when the deal was over. Apart from acquiring further A320s, the airline considered Boeing 737s and McDonnell Douglas MD-90s. In  the same year,  Boeing 767-300ERs and a Boeing 767-200, on lease from AWAS and Royal Brunei Airlines, respectively, were returned to the lessors, but in early 1997 another Boeing 767-300ER was phased in on a one-year lease from AWAS. With its freedom to operate Western-built aircraft, Vietnam Airlines considered the acquisition of long-haul aircraft to better service Vietnamese living overseas. The Airbus A340, Boeing 747 and the McDonnell Douglas MD-11 were topics of discussion. Meanwhile, two Fokker 70s were acquired in May and July to replace the twelve Tupolev Tu-134s. On 3 September 1997, the crash of a Tupolev Tu-134B, on approach to Phnom Penh Pochentong Airport in bad weather, resulted in more than  fatalities.

A new livery was introduced in early 1998, initially unveiled on a Boeing 767.
In December 2001, Vietnam Airlines signed a historic agreement with Boeing for the acquisition of its first ever US-built aircraft, signalling the start of trade under the Bilateral Trade Agreement between the two countries. The deal involved four Boeing 777-200ERs. The transaction was valued at  million; the first aircraft was initially scheduled for delivery in 2003. These four aircraft, along with six others of the same type that are leased from International Lease Finance Corporation (ILFC), are the flagships of the airline, and serve on medium and long-haul routes, respectively. During that year, the airline carried 3.4 million passengers, 1.9 million of whom were on domestic flights; flights to Beijing resumed and services to Kunming were launched. During 2002, Vietnam Airlines considered a lease offer from Airbus for two Airbus A340-300s. On 4 September 2003, a landmark ceremony celebrated the airline's receipt of its first Boeing 777-200ER purchased outright from Boeing. On 28 October, the airline decided to move its operations in Moscow from Sheremetyevo International Airport to Domodedovo International Airport.

In June 2005, Vietnam Airlines ordered four Boeing 787-8s. Twelve additional 787-8s were ordered in late 2007, some of them to be directly acquired from the company, and the rest to be purchased by the carrier's subsidiary Vietnam Aircraft Leasing Company (VALC). These new aircraft were to allow Vietnam Airlines to expand its network and replace some leased aircraft. Regarding the delays from Boeing, CEO Pham Ngoc Minh remarked in September 2009, "We are not happy about the constant delays. It affects our business plan. We expected to get our planes in 2009, then 2010, and now nobody can confirm to us which is the exact delivery date. I can be patient but it gives us a lot of headaches."

On 20 June 2005, the airline launched direct services to Frankfurt after having discontinued services to Berlin. It came after the 2004–2005 period when travel between the two countries soared 70%. The following year, Vietnam Airlines was admitted into IATA. As part of the move, Vietnam Airlines had to meet the association's IOSA safety standards.

Expansion: 2007–current

According to a number of newspaper reports in 2007, the Vietnamese government planned to partly privatize Vietnam Airlines. In the plan, the government considered selling 20–30% of the airline's stake to outsiders, with the government holding the balance. This was a small part of a bigger proposal by the government to privatize its state-owned companies, due to be completed by 2010. Vietnam authorized the plan the following year; however, the plan was not carried out as the airline missed its deadline scheduled by the government, which was arranged for 2010, due to the Global Financial Crisis.

On 1 October 2007, the airline and VALC signed a memorandum of understanding for the purchase of ten Airbus A350 XWBs, and 20 additional Airbus A321s. The Airbus A350s will supplement the Boeing 787s already ordered by the airline. This single order will result in Vietnam Airlines becoming one of the largest Airbus operators in Asia. The two companies also ordered five extra ATR 72-500s in December 2007.

Vietnam was chosen as the host of Miss World's 60th contest in 2008. As the country's national airline, Vietnam Airlines was selected as the sponsoring airline for the beauty pageant. Therefore, it was tasked the job of managing all the transport matters for the contest, to be carried out during September and October, just before the beginning of the competition. However, it was later decided to carry out the event in Sanya, China, following speculations of Vietnam withdrawing. In , Vietnam Airlines added Nagoya, the airline  point served in Japan besides Fukuoka, Osaka and Tokyo, to the route network.

In 2009, Vietnam Airlines and the Government of Cambodia established a joint-venture, having 49% and 51% stockholding, respectively, with the goal of boosting tourism in Cambodia. The joint-venture was a new Cambodian national airline named Cambodia Angkor Air, which started flying in July the same year, using ATR-72 aircraft; an Airbus A321 joined the fleet in September. Also in 2009, the carrier signed a deal for another 16 Airbus A321s plus two Airbus A350s, during the Paris Air Show.

On 26 August 2010, the airline teamed up with Boeing during the unveiling of its interior modernization programme to increase passenger comfort. From late September to early October, Vietnam Airlines discounted up to 85% of its 90,000 fares to celebrate Thang Long-Hanoi's 1000th anniversary.

In January 2011, plans were announced by the airline to re-initiate an initial public offering (IPO) by the end of 2012; an earlier attempt was stalled by the 2007–2010 financial crisis. Scheduled for mid-2014 after several delays, the IPO and subsequent share-offerings will supply the funds to expand Vietnam Airlines' fleet and network. With the company valued at  billion, the government plans to initially keep 75% of the shares. The IPO plan was submitted to the Vietnamese Ministry of Transport in June 2014. Scheduled to commence on 14 November 2014, the IPO has already received two submissions from foreign companies, yet their names have not been disclosed. The corporation will be restructured by 2015 to bring it in line with other state-owned enterprises and to shift its focus away from non-core businesses. Following restructuring, the airline group will consist of Vietnam Airlines itself, as well as three carriers; in total, the corporation will comprise 26 independently audited companies.

In February 2012, Vietnam Airlines boosted its stake in the low-cost carrier Jetstar Pacific Airlines to 70%, with Qantas holding the balance. The Vietnamese flag carrier was the major shareholder in Vietnam's second largest airline, but its stake had been transferred to the Ministry of Finance, and subsequently to the Vietnamese State Capital Investment Corporation (SCIC). The carrier's takeover of SCIC's stake in Jetstar Pacific will capitalise the low-cost carrier with  million, an amount that will be directed towards fleet renewal. In late April 2012, the aircraft lessor ALC announced the placement of an order for eight Boeing 787-9s, which will be leased to Vietnam Airlines; deliveries are expected to start in 2017. In late May 2012, the carrier signed an agreement with Vietnam's Eximbank for a loan worth  million, which the carrier will use to finance the acquisition of four Airbus A321s; a further  million was loaned in April 2013 to finance the purchase of eight Boeing 787s. In a deal valued at  billion, Vietnam Airlines signed a contract with General Electric in October 2013 for 40 engines to power the Boeing 787 aircraft the airline has on order.
In July 2014, a new route to Tokyo-Haneda from Hanoi was introduced. Vietnam Airlines received its first Airbus A350-900 in late June 2015, becoming the second operator of the type worldwide after Qatar Airways. In , the airline first Boeing 787-9 entered the fleet. In November 2018, the carrier received its first Airbus A321neo. Vietnam Airlines' participation in Cambodia Angkor Airlines ended in April 2020 when all the shares were sold to an undisclosed buyer, while acquiring all Qantas's stake in Jetstar Pacific, eventually rebranding the carrier as Pacific Airlines in the same year. In November 2021, Vietnam Airlines started its first direct non-stop service to the United States, from Ho Chi Minh City to San Francisco.

Corporate affairs and identity

Vietnam Airlines Company Limited was a limited liability company wholly owned by the government of Vietnam, having been restructured from Vietnam Airlines Corporation in June 2010 and then formally became Vietnam Airlines Joint Stock Company in 2015, which is considered as a "exceptional milestone" by the airline. Its role is to provide economic gains to the country, as its tasks, in addition to scheduled passenger and cargo transport, include "responsibility towards labor, contribution to the state budget, and providing chartered flights", according to former CEO Dao Manh Nhung. The airline is headed and overseen by a seven-seat management team, members of which are selected by the Prime Minister of Vietnam. As of September 2022, Dang Ngoc Hoa is the chairman of the company, whereas Le Hong Ha is the President and CEO. As of December 2019, the workforce of the Group numbered 21,255 employees with Vietnam Airlines itself employing 6,409 people. The airline is headquartered in the Long Bien District of Hanoi; previously it was headquartered at Gia Lam Airport in Gia Lam, Hanoi.

When Vietnam Airlines wholly owned Pacific Airlines after Jetstar's withdrawal of stakes in this low-cost carrier, the Corporation has started to use the term Vietnam Airlines Group to refer a group consisting of three airlines owned by Vietnam Airlines including Vietnam Airlines (itself), Pacific Airlines and Vietnam Air Services Company.

Training
In 2009, the airline, Airbus and ESMA Aviation Academy created Bay Viet Flight Training Company to train pilots in the country, with the expectation that up to 100 trainees would graduate annually. In October 2010, the company planned to train 60 pilots in Vietnam during 2011–2012. In 2010, Vietnam Airlines needed 636 pilots, 60% of whom were Vietnamese. It planned to raise that figure it to 75% by 2015, meaning there will be at least 100 new recruits each year from 2010 until 2015. Vietnam Airlines also contracts CAE Global Academy Phoenix in Arizona, United States, to train its cadets.

Financial performance
Vietnam Airlines has enjoyed an average of 37% increase in passengers flown per year until 1997, when the Asian Financial Crisis and other contributing causes led to a loss in profits for the airline. Nevertheless, the airline remained profitable throughout the crisis. In 1996, the airline carried 2.5 million passengers, up 18% from 1995. The airline carried more than 4 million passengers in 2002, which is an 18% increase over the previous year. Its cargo traffic also climbed 20% during the same period, resulting in a 2002 profit of US$35.77 million.

Despite the severe acute respiratory syndrome (SARS) outbreak, the airline posted a US$26.2 million profit for 2003. In 2006, it carried 6.8 million passengers (3.7 million international) and earned revenue of nearly US$1.37 billion (first 11 months). Vietnam Airlines carried more than 9 million passengers, of which 4 million were international travellers in 2007, the year which saw the airline earning a gross profit of US$23 million from a revenue of US$1.23 billion. It also transported 115,100 tonnes of cargo. In 2009, the airline's revenue was US$1.3 billion, compared to US$1.56 billion it earned the previous year. During this period, Vietnam Airlines carried 9.3 million passengers. According to Anna.aero, Vietnam Airlines' passenger capacity for 2010 rose 30% over the same period of the previous year. This also coincided with the increase in capacity at Vietnamese airports, at 21%. In 2012, the company's total revenue totalled US$2.4 billion, with profits totalling US$3.3 million. The following year, the carrier posted a  million gross profit.

Vietnam Airlines held about 40% of the market share of international passengers flying to and from Vietnam in February 2012. At the time, Vietnam Airlines controlled 77% share of the domestic aviation market, with 14% covered by Jetstar Pacific. As of December 2012, Vietnam Airlines controlled just below 70% of the domestic market share.

In July 2021, it was announced that Vietnam Airlines employees can buy 70 million shares as strategic shareholder ANA Holdings transferred 70 million shares to 15,100 employees of the Vietnam Airlines Group.

Subsidiaries and affiliates

Vietnam Airlines Group has at least 20 subsidiaries and affiliates. By the end of its restructuring in 2015, the company will have offloaded its stakes in more than 10 enterprises.

Aircraft maintenance and production
Vietnam Airlines is increasingly becoming involved in the maintenance, overhauling, and production of aircraft. Maintenance works are carried out by Vietnam Airlines Engineering Company (VAECO), that was established on 1 January 2009. VAECO was organized mainly upon the amalgamation of the A75 and A76 aircraft maintenance bases. VAECO carries out maintenance and technical services for Vietnam Airlines as well as for other airlines. The establishment of this company opens a new era to the aircraft maintenance field in Vietnam. As of 2013, VAECO was capable of performing a wide range of maintenance on many different aircraft types; this includes C-checks for the Boeing 777, Airbus A330, Airbus A320 and Airbus A321; and D-checks, the most thorough of all maintenance procedures, which are carried out on the ATR 72 and Fokker 70.

In addition to its self maintenance facilities, Vietnam Airlines also has maintenance contracts with other airlines and maintenance organisations.

There are currently no production facilities in Vietnam for aircraft and spare parts. However, Boeing has managed to obtain 35% of the distribution market in Vietnam, and GE Aviation, in turn, supplies jet engines for the Boeing aircraft. For the future, conversely, Vietnam Airlines is planning to build a maintenance factory in conjunction with Rolls-Royce and other companies. It has also signed a memorandum of understanding with EADS, a pan-European aerospace and defence corporation, that would let the corporation assemble and manufacture plane components in the future.

Destinations

Vietnam Airlines has a network within Asia, North America, Europe and Oceania. With about 300 daily flights, the airline flies to 21 destinations domestically, and to 43 internationally. In addition, it has codeshare agreements with a number of airlines for other routes, some of which span to North America.

Tết flights
Vietnam Airlines have traditionally increased flights among Vietnamese cities to cater for the heavy demands brought by the annual Tết celebration. This busy period, which could fall anywhere from late January to mid-February, is Vietnam's most important celebration; hundreds of extra flights are scheduled by domestic airlines during this period to allow Vietnamese to return to their families, often in rural areas, to celebrate the occasion. In 2010, the airline increased its seat capacity from 45% to 120% on certain domestic routes. In 2011, it increased additional flights on ten routes, adding more than 100,000 seats. About 63,000 of these seats were between Hanoi and Ho Chi Minh City. This represented a remarkable 41% increase against normal days. In 2013, the carrier added an extra 174,000 seats during the celebratory period, of which 82,000 seats were on the trunk route between its primary hubs.

Alliances
Vietnam Airlines joined the SkyTeam airline alliance on 10 June 2010.

Codeshare agreements
Vietnam Airlines codeshares with the following airlines:

 Aeroflot
 Air Europa
 Air France
 All Nippon Airways
 Bangkok Airways
 Cambodia Angkor Air
 Cathay Pacific
 China Airlines
 China Eastern Airlines
 China Southern Airlines
 Czech Airlines
 Delta Air Lines
 El Al
 Etihad Airways
 Finnair
 Garuda Indonesia
 ITA Airways
 Kenya Airways
 KLM
 Korean Air
 Lao Airlines
 Middle East Airlines
 Pacific Airlines
 Philippine Airlines
 Qantas
 Saudia
 SNCF (Railway)
 TAROM
 XiamenAir
 VASCO

Fleet

Current

, Vietnam Airlines operates the following aircraft:

Previously operated

Since its conception in 1956, the airline has operated a wide range of aircraft, including Soviet, American, and European aircraft. Having retired all Soviet-made planes, the airline currently uses Boeing, ATR, and Airbus aircraft.
Vietnam Airlines had operated the following aircraft throughout its history:

 Aero Ae-45
 Airbus A300-600
 Airbus A300B4
 Airbus A310-200
 Airbus A310-300
 Airbus A320-200
 Airbus A321-100
 Airbus A330-200
 Airbus A330-300
 Airbus A340-200
 Antonov An-2
 Antonov An-24
 Antonov An-30
 ATR 72-200
ATR 72-500
 Boeing 707-320
 Boeing 707-320B
 Boeing 707-320C
 Boeing 727-200
 Boeing 737-300
 Boeing 767-200ER
 Boeing 767-300ER
 Boeing 777-200ER
 Douglas DC-3
 Douglas DC-4
 Douglas DC-6
 Fokker 70
 Ilyushin Il-14G
 Ilyushin Il-18
 Lisunov Li-2
 Tupolev Tu-134A
 Tupolev Tu-134B
 Yakovlev Yak-40

Services

Entertainment
On flights operated using Airbus A350 and Boeing 787, Vietnam Airlines offers In-flight entertainment via personal televisions. On flights operated using Airbus A321neo, Vietnam Airlines offers In-flight entertainment via personal devices. Entertainment options consist of films, games, TV programmes, audiobooks and music. Vietnam Airlines offers two in-flight magazines, Heritage and Heritage Fashion, in addition to other reading material.

Cabins
Business
Business class is the highest of three cabin classes offered by the airline. As is the case with business class cabins in most airlines, the amenities offered in this class are substantially different from economy class, and more services and products are available. On Airbus A321s, recliner seats are offered, laid out in a 2-2 configuration. The seat offers 45 inch of pitch, 10 degree of recline as well as foot and leg rest. On Boeing 787s and Airbus A350s, lie-flat seats in a 1-2-1 configuration are offered. A 15.4 inch entertainment screen is available on the two aircraft. Seats are arranged in a reverse herringbone configuration on Boeing 787 and staggered seating is available on Airbus A350. Refreshments are offered on flights over 90 minutes, with hot meals available on flights that are longer than two hours.

This class is offered only on flights operated by Boeing 787 Dreamliner or Airbus A350. On every flight featuring Premium Economy, hot meals are served with an extensive menu of Vietnamese delicacies and popular world cuisine. Personal care bags with essential amenities are also provided. Premiere brand cosmetics and aqua water are available in the restroom during longer flights. Refreshments are served on flights over 90 minutes, with hot meals available on flights that are longer than two hours.

Economy

Economy class is available on all flights operated by Vietnam Airlines. Seats in this cabin feature seats  in width. Refreshments are offered on flights over 90 minutes, with hot meals available on flights that are longer than two hours.

Accidents and incidents

According to Aviation Safety Network, Vietnam Airlines experienced six accidents/incidents since 1951, with three of them leading to fatalities. All of the deadly accidents occurred on final approach, and all involved Soviet-built aircraft. The deadliest one took place on 19 September 1988, when a Tupolev Tu-134A crashed on approach to Don Mueang International Airport, killing 76 of 90 occupants aboard. The second-deadliest accident occurred on 3 September 1997, when a Tupolev Tu-134B-3 crashed after hitting trees on approach to Phnom Penh International Airport; the death toll rose to 65. The third-deadliest accident occurred on 14 November 1992, when a Yakovlev Yak-40 crashed on approach to Nha Trang Airport, killing 30 of 31 occupants aboard. The airline has also experienced a hijacking episode in 1992, without any recorded fatality.

See also

 Air transport in Vietnam
 List of airlines of Vietnam

Footnotes

References

External links

 
 Vietnam Airlines Cargo Services 
 

 
Airlines of Vietnam
Airlines established in 1956
Government-owned airlines
Government-owned companies of Vietnam
Vietnamese brands
SkyTeam
Companies based in Hanoi
1956 establishments in North Vietnam